The Bell's Cup was a tournament on the Sunshine Tour during the early 1990s. International stars like Vijay Singh and Ernie Els won the event.

Winners 
1991  John Bland
1992  David Feherty
1993  Vijay Singh
1994  Tony Johnstone
1995  Ernie Els

References 

Former Sunshine Tour events
Golf tournaments in South Africa